'Yemi Adamolekun is executive director of Enough is Enough (Nigeria). She campaigns for better governance in Nigeria and is also a senior associate in the Center for Strategic and International Studies. She participates in political discussions and was awarded a Global Citizen Prize in 2022.

Early life 
Adamolekun grew up on the campus of Obafemi Awolowo University at Ifẹ in Nigeria and started her education at the University of Lagos. She then studied at the University of Virginia and pursued postgraduate qualifications at the London School of Economics and the Saïd Business School, at the University of Oxford.

Career 

Adamolekun began her career working at Navigant Consulting in the US, then returned to Nigeria to work at Alder Consulting. She became executive director of Enough is Enough (Nigeria), which campaigns for better governance. The organisation co-ordinates different groups and broadcasts radio shows in 25 states. It supports local initiatives, for example working against violence in Katsina, reopening a healthcare centre in Osun State and helping to repair the roofs of schools in Niger State. Adamolekun commented to AllAfrica: "part of why Nigeria is unpeaceful is huge amounts of poverty: people fighting over scarce resources, insecurity, distrust – people desperate to survive". During the elections, Enough is Enough began its "RSVP" campaign, encouraging people to Register, Select, Vote and Protect. It also demanded more transparency in the National Assembly and participated in the "BringBackOurGirls" movement following the Chibok schoolgirls kidnapping. 

Adamolekun is also a senior associate in the Center for Strategic and International Studies.

Other events 
In 2018, Adamolekun's name appeared on the list of Most Influential People of African Descent (MIPAD). Also in 2018, she criticised President Muhammadu Buhari for going abroad to seek medical treatment for him and his son, whilst healthcare professionals in Nigeria were on strike for better working conditions.

Alongside Israel Aye, Ndidi and Yemi Osinaike, Adamolekun was on a panel which asked political candidates questions in the Lagos Gubernatorial debate before the 2019 Nigerian general election. She then became a spokesperson for the Not in My Church movement, when Pastor Biodun Fatoyinbo returned to the Common Wealth of Zion Assembly church a month after leaving it in the wake of underage rape allegations.

In November 2019, she attended a demonstration in support of Omoyele Sowore in Abuja and alleged that members of the State Security Service had attacked her and broken her mobile telephone whilst she was recording two journalists being beaten up. She had pledged to attend every court hearing of Sowore. In December 2019, Sowore was released and arrested again the next day, and Adamolekun was at another demonstration which was attacked by unknown people. In 2022, she was awarded a Global Citizen Prize.

References

External links

Year of birth missing (living people)
Alumni of Saïd Business School
Alumni of the London School of Economics
Nigerian women business executives
Nigerian women activists
University of Lagos alumni
University of Virginia alumni
Living people
Yoruba women activists
Nigerian nonprofit businesspeople
Yoruba women in business
Nigerian human rights activists